Tepilia fastidiosa is a moth in the Phiditiidae family. It was described by Paul Dognin in 1901.

References

Bombycoidea
Moths described in 1901